Devonport High School for Boys is a grammar school and academy, for boys aged 11 to 18, in Plymouth, Devon, England. It has around 1,135 pupils. Its catchment area includes southwest Devon and southeast Cornwall as well as Plymouth. Pupils are accepted on the basis of academic aptitude.

School history
The school was founded by Alonzo Rider on Albert Road, Stoke, Devonport, on 16 January 1896 to meet the needs of boys in Devonport and the surrounding area who sought a career in the Royal Navy, as engineers and civil servants.

In 1906, the Devonport Borough Council took over the school and over the next thirty years it continued to teach boys who came from the city or in by train from the Tamar Valley and Cornwall. Old Boys went on to careers both locally and nationally – and especially in the MoD. In 1941 the school was evacuated to Penzance because of World War II and in 1945 returned to the present site, the former Stoke Military Hospital on Paradise Road, which had been built in 1797. A book by former student and teacher Henry Whitfeld called A Torch in Flame, chronicles the history of the school from its founding to the death of headmaster Dr Cresswell in 1974. Since 1904, there has also been an annual school magazine made by pupils with the purpose of keeping students, parents and Old Boys informed about developments and information concerning the school, although this has never been well-publicised or documented.

Academic standards
In 2002, the Department for Education and Skills (DfES) designated the school as one of the first four specialist engineering colleges in England.  In 2006, it was judged to be a High Performing Specialist School (HPSS) and rebid successfully for a second 4-year period of Engineering Specialism. In April 2007, it took up a second specialism in languages.
After the OFSTED inspection in October 2007, the school successfully gained redesignation for Engineering and, with its HPSS status re-affirmed, successfully applied a third specialism "Applied Learning" which commenced during 2009. This specialism encouraged subject teaching to make reference to relevance in the world of work.

The school was inspected again in February 2011, and was designated as an "Outstanding" school, paving the way for the school's conversion to "Type Two" Academy Status in early March 2011, under the Coalition Government's Academy scheme.

The school's academic performance can be assessed on the UK government's DfES website.

DHSB headteachers

 1896–1906 AJ Rider 
 1906–1932 AF Treseder 
 1933–1941 HAT Simmonds 
 1942–1948 WH Buckley
 1949–1953 SB Barker 
 1953–1974 JL Cresswell 
 1975–1993 JGW Peck 
 1993–2008 NM Pettit (Nic Pettit)
 2008–2015  KJ Earley
 2015–          DJJ Roberts

School houses
Until the merger with Tamar High School at the end of the 1980s there were three 'forms' of pupils who were separate during their first three years, then began to mix as they opted into different subjects (North, South and West or N, S and W).  Forms after O-Levels or GCSEs were also somewhat disrupted into new tutor groups each year. The merger with Tamar generated a new form of mixed pupils from both schools: East.  From 2009 there are six forms, again from an even even split from the previous four (C, E, N, P, S, W) still based on compass points.

Actual 'houses' being more sport-oriented or social, took longer to coalesce.  Before the 2009 changes these were Drake, Raleigh, Gilbert and Grenville.  After 2009 there were six: Campbell, Edison, Newton, Priestley, Smeaton and Winstanley. 

The houses continue to compete each year for the St Levan's Shield, i.e. relating to west Cornwall, and also St Levan Road, which is the boundary between Stoke and the new working suburb of Devonport, Keyham, Plymouth which had been built of the reclaimed Keyham Creek.

School buildings
Based within what was once the Stoke Military Hospital, the school buildings and blocks are all named after notable people with links to Plymouth. The names of these buildings are shortened to their initial for the designation of classroom numbers. Blocks A–E are all connected via an arched colonnade and balcony, while Blocks A and F are connected via an enclosed bridge.

Uzel House

The school had a residential centre in the French town of Uzel in Brittany.  This offered pupils the opportunity for work experience with local companies as well as the chance to improve their French and enjoy activities like horseriding and canoeing.  The house was bought for the token amount of 1 Franc in 1991, from the Mayor of Uzel. From opening in 1992, until its closure in 2009 over 250 boys visited the house each year. The Friday Choir also took pupils from two other Plymouth grammar schools, Plymouth High School for Girls and Devonport High School for Girls, to Uzel for an opportunity to sing to the locals. These, and many other Friday Choir tours, were organised by music teacher Trefor K Farrow. Mr Farrow joined DHSB in 1965 and completed his fortieth and final year in 2006. In 2010 there were concerns about the House's long term sustainability as a result of the recession. Ownership of the house was lost during the tenure of Kieran Earley.

Notable former pupils

Notable alumni include:
 Ben Cross, actor, Chariots of Fire 
 Roger Davies, Chairman of Going Places from 1994 to 1997, and Thomson Holidays from 1984 to 1990
 John Dyson, Ambassador to Montenegro from 2006 to 2007
 Alfred Eddy, Professor of Biochemistry at UMIST from 1959 to 1994
 David Felwick CBE, Deputy Chairman of John Lewis Partnership from 2002 to 2004
 Richard Foster CBE, Chief Executive of the CPS from 2002 to 2007
 Donald Hamley, diplomat
 Sir Martin Harris CBE, Vice-Chancellor of University of Essex from 1987 to 1992, Vice-Chancellor of University of Manchester from 1992 to 2004 and President of Clare Hall, Cambridge
 Stephen Hiscock, High Commissioner to Guyana and Ambassador to Suriname from 2002 to 2006
 Rear-Adm Terence Loughran CB, Commander of HMS Ark Royal from 1993 to 1994
 Christopher Murphy, Conservative MP for Welwyn Hatfield from 1979 to 1987
 Sir Austin Pearce CBE (1921–2004), former chairman of British Aerospace from 1980 to 1987 and chairman of the trustees of the Science Museum, who captained DHSB's athletics and rugby teams during his time there. Also Chairman of Esso UK from 1972 to 1980 and President of the Institute of Petroleum from 1968 to 1970.
 Tim Thornton, Church of England bishop
 Ian Trigger, film and stage actor

References

External links
 School website
 DHS Old Boys online

Educational institutions established in 1896
Grammar schools in Plymouth, Devon
Boys' schools in Devon
1896 establishments in England
Academies in Plymouth, Devon